Babina Poljana may refer to:

Babina Poljana (Trgovište), a village in the Trgovište municipality of Pčinja District, Serbia
Babina Poljana (Vranje), a village in the Vranje municipality of Pčinja District, Serbia